James Montgomery MM (1890 – 14 November 1960) was an English professional football right half who played in the Football League for Glossop and Manchester United. He also served Manchester United as a youth coach.

Personal life 
Montgomery served as a lance corporal in the Royal Inniskilling Fusiliers during the First World War and was awarded the Military Medal.

Career statistics

References

1890 births
1960 deaths
Footballers from County Durham
English footballers
Association football wing halves
Manchester United F.C. players
Glossop North End A.F.C. players
Bishop Auckland F.C. players
Craghead United F.C. players
Crewe Alexandra F.C. players
British Army personnel of World War I
Royal Inniskilling Fusiliers soldiers
Recipients of the Military Medal
Manchester United F.C. non-playing staff